Chah Mahku (also Romanized as Chāh Mahkū) is a village in Gohreh Rural District, Fin District, Bandar Abbas County, Hormozgan Province, Iran. At the 2006 census, its population was 113, in 28 families.

References 

Populated places in Bandar Abbas County